The St Kilda Pavilion is a historic kiosk located at the end of St Kilda Pier, in St Kilda, Victoria, Australia. It is listed on the Victorian Heritage Register.

History 
The kiosk was designed by James Charles Morell and built in 1904 by John W. Douglas. The kiosk was proposed and operated by Francis Parer. Until the 1930s, the structure was widely known as Parer's Pavilion; however, its actual name was the Austral Refreshment Rooms. In the 1930s it was renamed Kerby's Kiosk. Noble and Ivy Kerby acquired the lease from the Victorian Government in 1939. The Kerby family were involved with running the kiosk from 1934 until 1987. From 1987 until 2003 the kiosk was leased and operated by Joe Sillitoe, then Carmel Grant.

On 11 September 2003 the structure was destroyed in an arson attack. After massive public support to rebuild the kiosk and the support of Premier Steve Bracks, it was reconstructed to the original 1903 plans, utilising some of the salvaged components, such as the cast iron roof, decorative cresting and weather vane. An additional structure, expanding the capacity was erected directly behind the kiosk and is obscured by the pavilion when viewed from the pier. The kiosk reopened in March 2006. The site is owned by Parks Victoria and is leased to Peter Tzambazis.

Gallery

References

External links
 Little Blue on St Kilda Pier

Heritage-listed buildings in Melbourne
Rebuilt buildings and structures in Australia
Victorian architecture in Victoria (Australia)
Federation style architecture
Buildings and structures in Australia destroyed by arson
Pavilion
Landmarks in Melbourne
Buildings and structures completed in 1904
1904 establishments in Australia
Buildings and structures completed in 2006
2006 establishments in Australia
Buildings and structures in the City of Port Phillip